Shenzhen Zhongjin Lingnan Nonfemet Co., Ltd. known as Zhongjin Lingnan in China or their English name Nonfemet (abbreviation of non-ferrous metal), is a Chinese company engaged in the mining and processing of lead, zinc and other non-ferrous metals. In 2015 financial year, the company also had 0.49% revenue from real estate development.

Lingnan is a word refer to southern China, including Guangdong province, while Zhongjin literally means China metal. As at 11 November 2016, Zhongjin Lingnan is a constituents of SZSE 100 Index and CSI 300 Index.

History
The firm was established in Shenzhen, Guangdong province in 1984, as a subsidiary of state-owned enterprise  (The national corporation dissolved in 1998, which provincial government takeover the management role). Its production base is in Shaoguan, Guangdong province, China. Zhongjin Lingnan also purchased a Canadian company as well as a company in Australia.

Recent Developments 
Zhongjin Lingnan was a signatory of a joint statement by ten of the world's top zinc producers published in 2015. In that statement, the zinc producers pledged to cut their output by 500,000 tonnes in 2016 in order to reduce overcapacities in the market and increase zinc prices.

Due to low metal prices, the company announced it would cut 100 jobs at its Australian Broken Hill mine in New South Wales, which it had acquired in 2013.

See also
 Rising Nonferrous Metals Share another publicly traded company which Guangdong Government is the indirect major shareholder

References

External links
 

Metal companies of China
Companies based in Shenzhen
Non-renewable resource companies established in 1984
1984 establishments in China
Companies owned by the provincial government of China
Companies listed on the Shenzhen Stock Exchange